Mike Marlin is an English singer-songwriter. He was born on 17 February 1961 in Wimbledon, London. He went to the University of Oxford where he read physics at Magdalen College. He dropped out in his final year and never graduated. During this time he played bass in a number of student bands.

History

Businesses
After leaving Oxford (where he was studying physics) in his final year, he dropped out of music. He worked in his father's commodity business. He automated his job by programming a computer, and became instead interested in technology. He was then a founder of a series of technology businesses. He was joined by David Harding and Martin Lueck, with whom he spun out to launch AHL, one of the most successful systematic trading firms ever.

Music career
Throughout the 1980s and 1990s he had continued to write and record songs, but these were never commercially released.

At the age of 48 he withdrew from business. He started a small record label, AMP Music Productions. He recorded his first album Nearly Man with producer James Durrant. The album was finished in December 2009. Marlin recruited a band in 2010 ("The Whethermen") and played a series of gigs in small venues throughout the UK. He recorded a session for Selector Radio that aired on 12 November 2010. In December 2010 he supported From The Jam on their UK tour.

Marlin's first single was a cover of the Bee Gees disco hit "Stayin' Alive" from the 1977 film Saturday Night Fever. It was released on 21 October 2010 to mixed reviews and is not on his debut album Nearly Man, which was released on 14 February 2011. Two singles were taken from this album: "Play That Game" (released 4 January 2011) and "No Place Like Home" (released 23 May 2011). These were critically well received and achieved significant airplay on independent radio, regional radio and BBC Radio 6 Music. The video for "Play That Game" attracted considerable attention and featured an office being destroyed.

In January 2011, he was chosen for HMV's Next Big Thing and as part of this event played at the Jazz Cafe in London on 9 February 2011. In March 2011, Marlin supported The Stranglers on their 17 date UK "Black & Blue" tour. In April 2011, Marlin supported Big Country on their 18 date UK tour.

In February 2012, he released his second album, Man on The Ground, and went on to support The Stranglers around the UK and Europe on their Spring tour. Marlin's voice is often compared to David Bowie. He sings in a baritone and plays a custom Babicz guitar. He writes traditional rock songs. He cites David Bowie, Johnny Cash, Elbow and The National as influences.

Marlin's third album, Grand Reveal, was released on 8 April 2013. Songs include "The Murderer" and "Skull Beneath the Skin".

Marlin's fourth album, The Secret of My Success, was released on 8 May 2016. The release was accompanied by a limited edition box set containing book of artwork by Colin Brown, the Scottish Collage artist and double LP. The latest incarnation of his band is a trio, The Melomaniacs, consisting of Marlin, Paul Silver on keys and Kim Murray on guitar.

Discography
Albums
 Nearly Man (2009)
 Man on the Ground (2012)
 Grand Reveal (2013)
 The Secret of My Success (2016)

Personal
He is married and has four children. He lives in Bedfordshire.

References

External links
 Official website
 Mike Marlin on YouTube

1961 births
Living people
English male singer-songwriters
Singers from London